The Negro Silent Protest Parade, commonly known as the Silent Parade, was a silent march of about 10,000 African Americans along Fifth Avenue starting at 57th Street in New York City on July 28, 1917. The event was organized by the NAACP, church, and community leaders to protest violence directed towards African Americans, such as recent lynchings in Waco and Memphis. The parade was precipitated by the East St. Louis riots in May and July 1917 where at least 40 black people were killed by white mobs, in part touched off by a labor dispute where blacks were used for strike breaking.

Background

East St. Louis riots

Prior to May 1917, there began a migration of blacks fleeing threats to life and liberty in the South. Tensions in East St. Louis, Illinois, were brewing between white and black workers. Many blacks had found employment in the local industry. In Spring 1917, the mostly white employees of the Aluminum Ore Company voted for a labor strike and the Company recruited hundreds of blacks to replace them.  The situation exploded after rumors of black men and white women fraternizing began to circulate. Thousands of white men descended on East St. Louis and began attacking African Americans. They destroyed buildings and beat people. The rioting died down, only to rise with vigor again several weeks later. After an incident in which a police officer was shot by black residents of the city, thousands of whites marched and rioted in the city again. The Encyclopedia of the Harlem Rennaissance states that "Eyewitnesses likened the mob to a manhunt, describing how rioters sought out blacks to beat, mutilate, stab, shoot, hang, and burn."

The brutality of the attacks by mobs of white people and the refusal by the authorities to protect innocent lives contributed to the responsive measures taken by some African Americans in St. Louis and the nation. Marcus Garvey declared in a speech that the riot was "one of the bloodiest outrages against mankind" and a "wholesale massacre of our people", insisting that "This is no time for fine words, but a time to lift one's voice against the savagery of a people who claim to be the dispensers of democracy." After the riots, many black people felt that there was little "possibility of the United States ever permitting black people to enjoy full citizenship, equal rights and dignity."

Writers and civil rights activists, W.E.B DuBois and Martha Gruening visited the city after the riot on July 2 in order to speak to witnesses and survivors. They wrote an essay describing the riots in "gruesome detail" for The Crisis, an NAACP publication.

Planning a response

James Weldon Johnson, the Field Secretary of the  National Association for the Advancement of Colored People (NAACP), worked with a group of influential community leaders at the St. Philip's Church in New York to decide how to protest the riots. The idea of a silent protest had first been suggested in a 1916 NAACP Conference by Oswald Garrison Villard. Black women in New York had also participated in earlier silent parades with white women, like the June 1917 silent parade in support of the Red Cross. Villard's mother, Fanny Garrison Villard, had organized a silent march for suffragettes in New York in 1913. However, for this protest, organizers felt that it was important that only black people participate because they were the main victims of the recent violence.

Two prominent members of the local clergy were tapped to serve as the executives for the parade. Rev. Dr. Hutchens C. Bishop, rector of the city's oldest Black Episcopal parish, and Rev. Dr. Charles D. Martin, founder of the Fourth Moravian Church, respectively, served as the President, and Secretary for the parade. With "righteous indignation", Dr. Martin wrote the call to action entitled simply "Why We March". It laid out the rationale for the protest, and was distributed before and during the parade.

The parade was advertised in The New York Age where it was described as a "mute but solemn protest against the atrocities and discrimination practiced against the race in various parts of the country." Men, women and children alike were invited to take part. It was hoped that around ten thousand people would be able to participate, and that African Americans in other cities might hold their own parades. The New York parade was announced ahead of time in other cities as well.

Protest in New York 
In the midst of record heat in New York City on July 28, an estimated 8,000 to 15,000 African Americans marched in silent protest to the lynchings, as in Waco, Memphis, and especially the East St. Louis riots. The march began at 57th Street, down Fifth Avenue, to its end at 23rd Street. Protesters carried signs that highlighted their discontent. Some signs and banners appealed directly to President Woodrow Wilson. A mounted police escort led the parade. Women and children were next, dressed in white. They were followed by the men, dressed in black. People of all races looked on from both sides of Fifth Avenue. The New York Age estimated that "fully fifteen thousand Negroes, who should have taken an active part, looked on." Black boy scouts handed out fliers describing why they were marching. During the parade, white people stopped to listen to black people explain the reasons for the march and other white bystanders expressed support and sympathy. Some of the messages written on fliers were:

 We march because by the Grace of God and the force of truth, the dangerous, hampering walls of prejudice and inhuman injustices must fall. 
 We march because we deem it a crime to be silent in the face of such barbaric acts.
 We march because we want our children to live a better life and enjoy fairer conditions than have fallen to our lot.

The parade marked the first large black-only protest parade in New York. The New York Times described it the following day: 

Media coverage of the march helped to counter the dehumanization of black people in the United States. The parade and its coverage helped depict the NAACP as a "well-organized and mannerly group" and also helped increase its visibility both among white and black people alike.

Marchers hoped to influence Democratic President Wilson to carry through on his election promises to African American voters to implement anti-lynching legislation and promote Black causes. Four days after the silent parade, black leaders involved in the protest, including Madame C.J. Walker, went to Washington D.C. for a planned appointment with the president. The appointment was not kept, as the group of leaders were told that Wilson had "another appointment." They left their petition for Wilson, which reminded him of African Americans serving in World War I and urged him to prevent riots and lynchings in the future. Wilson did not do so and repudiated his promises. Federal discrimination against African Americans significantly increased under the Wilson administration.

Organizers and leadership
While the parade was put on under the banner of the Harlem branch of the NAACP, a who's who of the Church and business community helped plan the event. The issue of the NAACP The Crisis magazine which described the parade quotes the New York World this way:

Legacy
The parade was the very first protest of its kind in New York, and the second instance of African Americans publicly demonstrating for civil rights. The Silent Parade evoked empathy by Jewish people who remembered pogroms against them and also inspired the media to express support of African Americans in their struggle against lynching and oppression.

Another large silent parade took place in Newark in 1918. On the day before the parade, members of the NAACP spoke at local churches about the parade and the Dyer Anti-Lynching Bill. Women from the New Jersey Federation of Colored Women's Clubs (NJFCWC) marched along with men and other women carrying signs. A large meeting was held in the Newark Armory when the parade was complete. Another NAACP-sponsored silent march happened on August 26, 1989 to protest recent Supreme Court decisions. The U.S. Park Service estimated over 35,000 people participated. The march was encouraged by NAACP director, Benjamin L. Hooks.

In East St. Louis, there was a week-long commemoration of the riots and march in the weeks prior to the 100th anniversary on July 28, 2017. Around 300 people marched from the SIUE East St. Louis Higher Learning Center to the Eads Bridge. Everyone marched in silence, with many women in white and men wearing black suits. Those who couldn't walk followed by car.

On the 100th anniversary, Google commemorated the parade in a Google Doodle. Many people in 2017 expressed online that they first learned about the Silent Parade through the day's Google Doodle.

A group of artists, along with the NAACP, planned a re-enactment of the silent march in New York for the evening on July 28, 2017. The event, with around 100 people and many participants wearing white, was not able to march down Fifth Avenue because the city would not grant access due to Trump Tower being located there. The commemoration took place on Sixth Avenue instead, and the group held up portraits of contemporary victims of violence by both police and vigilantes in the United States.

References

External links

 "Centennial of the 1917 Negro Silent Protest Parade: Marching Mission to Petition Congress for Progress", by Dante Haughton, (Nancy Kuhl), Yale University Beinecke Rare Book & Manuscript Library website, 26 July 2017.
 The Crisis (NAACP Magazine) September 1917 with articles on The Massacre of East St. Louis and The Negro Silent Protest Parade, New York City.

Civil rights protests in the United States
Protest marches in New York City
African-American history in New York City
African-American history between emancipation and the civil rights movement
History of African-American civil rights
Racially motivated violence against African Americans
Lynching in the United States
1917 in New York City
United States home front during World War I
July 1917 events
1917 protests